Below are alumni, benefactors, presidents or chancellors, and other notable people associated with Long Island University.

Alumni

Art
Bunny Hoest, cartoonist for the comic strip The Lockhorns

Business
Ray Dalio, founder of Bridgewater Associates
Howard Lorber, businessman; investor; CEO of Vector Group; chairman of Nathan's Famous and Douglas Elliman
Jorge M. Perez, real estate developer, author and political fundraiser; founder of The Related Companies
Adnan Polat, chairman of Football Club Galatasaray SK; CEO of Ege Seramik
Terry Semel, former chairman and CEO of Yahoo!; on the Board of Directors of Polo Ralph Lauren Corporation, The Paley Center for Media, and the Guggenheim Museum
John Utendahl, founder and owner of Utendahl Group, the largest African American-owned investment banking organization in the US
Gary Winnick, founder of Global Crossing, Ltd., installing the first undersea cable linking the U.S. and Europe

Judicial
Rose Bird, first woman to serve as chief justice on the Supreme Court of California

Media
A. J. Benza, television show host, actor (Celebrity Fit Club)
Ted David, senior anchor at CNBC Business Radio
John Edward, television host and producer
Arnold Hano, journalist, author, editor
Jackee Harry, known for her roles on the television series 227, Another World, and Designing Women, and the Rodney Dangerfield movie Ladybugs
Alfred R. Kahn, chairman and CEO, 4Kids Entertainment
Jamie Kellner, chairman and CEO of ACME Communications
Brian Kilmeade, television presenter and current co-host of Fox and Friends and Brian the Judge
Lynda Lopez, news anchor; sister of Jennifer Lopez
Nancy Hicks Maynard, first black female reporter for the New York Times; she and her husband are the first African Americans to own a major U.S. metropolitan newspaper, Oakland Tribune; they cofounded the Robert C. Maynard Institute for Journalism Education
Burl Osborne, former chairman of the Associated Press and former publisher of the Dallas Morning News
Sibila Vargas, news anchor
Larry Wachtel, the "Voice of Wall Street"; former senior vice president at Wachovia; financial analyst at Prudential Financial; respected financial markets commentator on WINS (AM) radio in New York City

Medicine and health
Ruth Kirschstein, former acting director of the National Institute of Health and the National Center for Complementary and Alternative Medicine; namesake of Ruth L. Kirschstein National Research Service Awards

Performing arts
Ed Lauter, actor
Dina Meyer, actress
Nicholas Pileggi, screenwriter and author
Michael Tucci, actor
Denise Vasi, actress

Politics

Tim Bishop, representative of the State of New York's 1st Congressional District in the House of Representatives in the United States Congress
Leon Bogues, former senator who represented the 29th District in the New York State Senate
Steven Cymbrowitz, representative of the 45th District in the New York State Assembly
Tuariki Delamere, former member of parliament for the Eastern Maori (now Ikaroa-Rāwhiti) electorate in the Parliament of New Zealand and cabinet minister, including Minister of Immigration
Katuutire Kaura, member of parliament in the National Assembly of the Republic of Namibia; leader of the Democratic Turnhalle Alliance of Namibia
Tom Ognibene, former representative of the 30th City Council District in the New York City Council and New York City mayoral candidate
Tinga Seisay, Sierra Leonean diplomat and pro-democracy advocate.
L. Harvey Smith, representative of the 31st District in the New Jersey General Assembly
Fred Thiele, representative of the 2nd District in the New York State Assembly
Rammohan Naidu Kinjarapu, is an Indian politician and a member of parliament to the 16th Lok Sabha from Srikakulam, Andhra Pradesh.
Mevlut Cavusoglu, incumbent Turkish Minister of Foreign Affairs

Sports and recreation

Mooley Avishar (born 1947), Israeli basketball player
Hank Beenders, first non-American to play in the NBA Finals
Frank Catalanotto, retired Major League Baseball outfielder
John Collins (sports executive), former president and chief executive officer of the NFL Cleveland Browns
Daniel de Oliveira (footballer), Rookie of the Year 1987, Northeast Conference; first LIU Blackbird soccer  player to play with DC United in 1995 Major League Soccer, two-time winner MVP Colin Fowles Trophy, 1987 and 1990; coach of the Venezuelan Youth 15 and 17 National Teams
Ray Felix, second African American to be named an NBA All-Star; the NBA's first dominant African-American center
Frido Frey, first German to play in the NBA
Sid Gordon, two-time All Star major league baseball player
David Hicks (basketball) (born 1988), basketball player for Ironi Nahariya of the Israeli Basketball Premier League
Charles Rahmel Jones, played for the NBA's Chicago Bulls
Dolly King, one of the rare black basketball players in the National Basketball League, predecessor to the NBA
 Barry Leibowitz (born 1945), American-Israeli basketball player 
Joe Machnik, elected to the National Soccer Hall of Fame on the 2017 builder ballot
Steve Nisenson, basketball player
Frank Pia, inventor of the Pia Carry
Ossie Schectman, a member of the original New York Knickerbockers in their inaugural NBA season in 1946 and inductee in the National Jewish Museum Sports Hall of Fame.
Tazz (Peter Senerchia), also known as Tazz in WWE, wrestler and commentator, ECW and TNA

Notable faculty

Past
Vincent de Tourdonnet, one of Canada's foremost writers of musical theatre
Pee Wee Kirkland, former street basketball player from New York City; taught the "Philosophy of Basketball Coaching"
Gerda Lerner, pioneer of women's history as an academic discipline
Lillian Rosanoff Lieber, mathematician and author
Marysa Navarro, historian

Present
Bob Brier, noted Egyptologist and one of the world's leading experts on mummies

References

 
Long Island University
Long Island-related lists